Mark Justin Roiland (born February 21, 1980) is an American voice actor, animator, writer, producer and director. He is best known as the co-creator of Adult Swim's animated sitcom Rick and Morty, for which he voiced the protagonists Rick Sanchez and Morty Smith, and as the co-creator of Hulu's Solar Opposites, in which he voiced the main character, Korvo, until both networks severed ties with him in 2023 respectively as a result of domestic abuse charges. He had also played Earl of Lemongrab on Adventure Time, Blendin Blandin on Gravity Falls, and Oscar on Fish Hooks. He founded the animation studio Justin Roiland's Solo Vanity Card Productions! and the video game studio Squanch Games, though he resigned from the latter in 2023.

Early life
Roiland was born and raised in Manteca, California. He attended Sierra High School up until the first quarter of his senior year and then transferred to Manteca High School for the remainder of his senior year, graduating in 1998. After high school, he attended Modesto Junior College in Modesto, California. Roiland is dyslexic. Roiland has claimed he was sexually assaulted by his cousin at age 7.

Career

Roiland got involved with Channel101, an L.A. media collective started by Dan Harmon and Rob Schrab, where he made and acted in numerous movie shorts (such as 2 Girls One Cup: The Show, House of Cosbys and a small role as musician Christopher Cross in the series Yacht Rock) and in the VH1 television show Acceptable TV. He appeared regularly on The Sarah Silverman Program on Comedy Central as "Blonde Craig". From 2010 to 2016, he co-hosted The Grandma's Virginity Podcast with future Rick and Morty writer, Ryan Ridley, and future Steven Universe producer, Jackie Buscarino.

In 2012, Adult Swim approached Harmon to produce a new animated series for their network. Harmon approached Roiland and together, they created Rick and Morty (based on Roiland's previous work for Channel 101, "The Real Animated Adventures of Doc and Mharti") which debuted in 2013 to widespread acclaim. The show quickly grew a fan community as audiences praised the show for its unique story telling and incorporation of science-fiction elements. Between 2013 and 2022, Roiland voiced Rick Sanchez and his grandson Morty Smith. In addition to the voice work, Roiland served as a co-writer and executive producer alongside Dan Harmon.  By the end of season 1, Rick and Morty became one of the most successful shows Adult Swim ever produced. The success of the show spearheaded an entire franchise around it. Various themed merchandise have been produced and sold. In addition to the show, an app called "Pocket Mortys" was created. On August 25, 2016, Roiland launched virtual reality studio Squanchtendo, a portmanteau of the company Nintendo and Rick and Morty character Squanchy. It was later renamed to Squanch Games. Its first full-length title, Accounting+, made in collaboration with William Pugh's studio, was released for PSVR on December 19, 2017.

In January 2021, Roiland offered over a dozen artworks in his first NFT art collection, titled "The Best I Could Do". His highest-selling piece was by his Simpsons homage The Smintons, sold at $290,100. The collection sold for a total of $1.65 million. Roiland also sold his first painting, titled mypeoplefriend, via auction by Sotheby's in July 2021.

On October 31, 2022, Roiland released a generative NFT project named "Art Gobblers" with Paradigm Ventures.

Legal issues
In August 2020, Roiland was arrested and charged with felony domestic battery and false imprisonment in Orange County, California, in connection with an alleged incident in January 2020 involving an unnamed woman he was reportedly dating at the time. Roiland was released on bail, after pleading not guilty, and pre-trial is scheduled for April 27, 2023. Knowledge of these events was not public until NBC News reported on the matter in January 2023.

After the charges were laid, multiple people came forward with their own allegations of abuse by Roiland, including claims of predatory behavior towards minors. He private messaged Allie Goertz, who was at the time preparing for a Rick and Morty concept album, and said "Can you write a song about 9 Dick’s [sic] of different sized and ethnic origins hanging above your face, and then in the lyrics describe how they each splatter you with semen.” 

Adult Swim announced later that month that Roiland had been dismissed from Rick and Morty due to the charges and his roles would be recast for future seasons. Squanch Games affirmed that Roiland had resigned from the company on January 16, 2023, in the wake of the Adult Swim news. On January 25, 20th Television Animation confirmed that he had also been removed from Solar Opposites and Koala Man, which will also continue to be produced without his involvement.

Filmography

Film

Television

Web

Video games
In August 2016, Roiland set up a video game studio, Squanchtendo, which was later renamed to Squanch Games in December 2017.

Awards and nominations

References

External links
 
 
 
 The Grandma's Virginity Podcast
 Cartoons, Comics, and stuff by Justin Roiland

1980 births
Living people
21st-century American comedians
21st-century American screenwriters
21st-century American male writers
Animators from California
American male voice actors
American male television actors
American satirists
American surrealist artists
American cartoonists
American animated film directors
American animated film producers
American television directors
American television writers
Comedians from California
Journalists from California
Male actors from California
American male television writers
People from Manteca, California
Actors with dyslexia
Writers with dyslexia
Primetime Emmy Award winners
Annie Award winners
Screenwriters from California
Television show creators
Showrunners
Television producers from California
American people of Norwegian descent